John Patrick Nicholson (July 30, 1889 – April 2, 1940) was an American track and field athlete who competed in the 1912 Summer Olympics. He ran in the final of the 110 meter hurdles competition but fell and did not finish the race. He also participated in the high jump event but was not able to clear a height.

After finishing his athletics career, Nicholson went on to become a track coach. He coached at DePauw University, Sewanee:The University of the South, Rice University, and the University of Notre Dame. He died suddenly on April 2, 1940.

Head coaching record

Football

References

External links
 
 

1889 births
1940 deaths
American male hurdlers
American male high jumpers
Athletes (track and field) at the 1912 Summer Olympics
Basketball coaches from Pennsylvania
DePauw Tigers track and field coaches
Missouri Tigers men's track and field athletes
Notre Dame Fighting Irish track and field coaches
Olympic track and field athletes of the United States
People from Greenville, Pennsylvania
Rice Owls men's basketball coaches
Sewanee Tigers football coaches
Sewanee Tigers men's basketball coaches
Track and field athletes from Pennsylvania
Sewanee Tigers track and field coaches